Jalamb is one of the  constituencies of Maharashtra Vidhan Sabha in the Buldhana district during 1957-1962 and 1978-to-2004 State elections. It was established in 1957 as then Bombay State Vidhan Sabha (Assembly) constituency located in Buldhana district. For these 1957 and 1962 elections,  adjoining Shegaon Assembly constituency was dissolved.

It was dissolved for 1967 and 72 elections to Maharashtra, and adjoining Shegaon Assembly constituency was re-established.

Jalamb constituency was re-established for second time for the state election from 1978 and continue to exist till 2004 elections. It has been dissolved for second time from 2009 elections, as Jalgaon (Jamod) Assembly constituency was re-established after 1951 elections.

Member of Legislative Assembly
1951: Does not exist
1957: Vithal Sadashio, Indian National Congress (from Jalamb ( Constituency no 250 of then Bombay State ) ) 
1962: Patil Kashiram Raibhan, Peasants and Workers Party of India(from Jalamb ( Constituency no 163 of Maharashtra  State ) ) 
1967: Does not exist
1972: Does not exist
1978: Dhokne Tulshiram Pandhari, Peasants and Workers Party of India(from Jalamb ( Constituency no 108 of Maharashtra State ) )
1980: Tapre Shraddha Prabhakarrao, Indian National Congress
1985: Tapre Shraddha Prabhakarrao, Indian National Congress//Gajananrao Shankarrao Deshmukh -PWPI ( Runner)
1990: Ingle Krushnarao Ganpatrao, Shiv Sena
1995: Ingle Krushnarao Ganpatrao, Indian National Congress
1999: Ingle Krushnarao Ganpatrao, Indian National Congress
2004: Dr. Sanjay Shriram Kute, Bhartiya Janata Party (from Jalamb ( Constituency no 108 of Maharashtra State ) )
2009 onwards : The seat does not exist

See also
 Shegaon
 Sangrampur, India
 Jalgaon (Jamod)
 Shegaon Assembly constituency
 Jalgaon(Jamod) Assembly constituency

Notes

Former assembly constituencies of Maharashtra
Constituencies established in 1957
1957 establishments in Bombay State
Constituencies disestablished in 1962
1962 disestablishments in India
Constituencies established in 1978
1978 establishments in Maharashtra
Constituencies disestablished in 2004
2004 disestablishments in India